WRAA is a Classic Country formatted broadcast radio station licensed to Luray, Virginia, serving Luray and Page County, Virginia. WRAA is owned and operated by Baker Family Stations, through licensee Positive Alternative Radio, Inc.

Sold
WRAA and sister station WMXH-FM were sold to Hayden Hamilton Media Strategies for $325,000 on June 4, 2014. The sale was closed on October 1, 2014. The two stations were sold again effective December 19, 2019, this time to Baker Family Stations for $165,000.

References

External links

1962 establishments in Virginia
Classic country radio stations in the United States
Radio stations established in 1962
RAA